A ramark, acronym for radar marker, was a type of radar beacon used to mark maritime navigational hazards. Ramarks are no longer in use.

They were wide-band beacons which transmitted either continuously or periodically on the radar bands. The transmission formed a line of Morse characters on a plan position indicator (PPI) radar display which radiated from the centre of the display to its edge, hence giving only a bearing, as opposed to radar beacon (racons) which gives bearing and position.

Periodic transmissions every few seconds are usually used so that important radar targets behind the ramark beacon are not masked by the Morse characters.  Ramark beacons are less commonly used than racons which give the location as well as the bearing of the hazard and do not clutter the display so much.

Navigational aids
Radar

de:Radar Beacon#Ramark